The Presbytery of Sheppards and Lapsley is an administrative district of the Presbyterian Church (USA) which comprises some 94 churches in central Alabama. The Presbytery of Sheppards and Lapsley is one of three presbyteries located in Alabama, and one of twelve comprising the "Synod of Living Waters" in Alabama, Mississippi, Tennessee and Kentucky. The Presbytery of Sheppards and Lapsley was established on January 11, 1988 at the First Presbyterian Church of Selma as a merger of several presbyteries from the former Presbyterian Church in the United States and United Presbyterian Church in the United States of America, the national bodies of which merged in 1983 to form the present PC (USA). PSL's headquarters are located at 3603 Lorna Ridge Drive in Hoover.
The (interim) Executive Presbyter is Sue Westfall. Associate executive presbyters oversee divisions focusing on "Nurture" and "Missions". A video resource library is maintained at the Presbytery offices. The Presbytery operates two retreat centers, the Gulftreat camp in Panama City Beach, Florida and Living River, a retreat on the Cahaba River south of Birmingham.

Origin 
The Presbytery of Sheppards and Lapsley is named for William Henry Sheppard and his wife, Lucy Gantt Sheppard, and for Samuel Lapsley, Alabama Presbyterians who established a mission in the Congo Valley in 1890.
In 2003 the Presbytery invited the Reverend Dr. Mulumba Mukundi, General Secretary of the Presbyterian Church in the Congo and President of the Presbyterian University of Sheppard and Lapsley there, to visit Birmingham. From that visit, a partnership was forged. In 2004 a delegation of eight people traveled to the DRC to work out a partnership agreement among PSL, the Nganga Presbytery, and the Tshibashi Presbytery. The agreement committed all three groups to participate in a mutual relationship, work together in prayer, evangelism, education and development, and to stay in contact through frequent visits.
This unique partnership was highlighted at the 217th PC(USA) General Assembly which PSL hosted at the Birmingham–Jefferson Convention Complex. Communionware created for the event was modeled after a Congolese wooden chalice given to the Presbytery; all attendees were each given a tote bag made in the Congo from traditional cloth, and a joint choir from the three presbyteries performed during worship services in Birmingham.

Member congregations 
Arlington Presbyterian Church
Auburn Korean Presbyterian Church
Bethel Presbyterian Church, Northport
Bold Springs Presbyterian Church, Birmingham
Brown Memorial Presbyterian Church, Tuscaloosa
Bryan Memorial Presbyterian Church, Birmingham
Butler Presbyterian Church
Cahaba Springs Presbyterian Church, Trussville
Calvary Presbyterian Church, Montgomery
Carmel Presbyterian Church, Piedmont
Center Point Presbyterian Church
Chapel in the Pines, Hoover
Church of the Covenant, Anniston
Covenant Presbyterian Church, Tuscaloosa
Cuba Presbyterian Church
Dodson Memorial Presbyterian Church, Oxford
Edgewood Presbyterian Church, Homewood
Fairfield Highlands Presbyterian Church
First Presbyterian Church, Alexander City
First Presbyterian Church, Anniston
First Presbyterian Church, Auburn
First Presbyterian Church, Bessemer
First Presbyterian Church (Birmingham, Alabama)
First Presbyterian Church, Carbon Hill
First Presbyterian Church, Dadeville
First Presbyterian Church, Eufala
First Presbyterian Church, Jacksonville
First Presbyterian Church, Livingston
First Presbyterian Church, Opelika
First Presbyterian Church, Phenix City
First Presbyterian Church, Piedmont
First Presbyterian Church, Reform
First Presbyterian Church, Selma
First Presbyterian Church, Sylacauga
First Presbyterian Church, Talladega
First Presbyterian Church, Tallassee
First Presbyterian Church, Tuscaloosa
First Presbyterian Church, Tuskegee
First Presbyterian Church, Wetumpka
First United Presbyterian Church, Anniston
First United Presbyterian Church, Birmingham
Five Mile Presbyterian Church, Birmingham
Gardendale Presbyterian Church
Good Hope Presbyterian Church, Bessemer
Good Shepherd Presbyterian Church, Anniston
Goodwater Presbyterian Church
Grace Covenant Presbyterian Church, Birmingham
Green Pond Presbyterian Church
Hadden Presbyterian Church, Livingston
Harper Chapel Presbyterian Church, Selma
Immanuel Presbyterian Church, Montgomery
Independent Presbyterian Church, Birmingham
Korean New Church Development, Anniston
Korean Presbyterian Church, Montgomery
Korean Presbyterian Church, Pelham
Korean Presbyterian Church, Tuscaloosa
Lebanon Presbyterian Church, Lafayette
Leeds Presbyterian Church
Leyden Hill Chapel New Church Development, Blue Mountain
Marion Junction Presbyterian Church
Memorial Presbyterian Church, Montgomery
Montevallo Presbyterian Church
Mount Pleasant Presbyterian Church, Plantersville
Mountain Brook Presbyterian Church
New Trinity Presbyterian Church, Camden
Northern Heights Presbyterian Church, Selma
Oakmont Presbyterian Church, Hoover
Odenville Presbyterian Church
Pisgah Presbyterian Church, Selma
Ramsay Memorial Presbyterian Church, Tuskegee
Riverchase Presbyterian Church, Hoover
Riverview Presbyterian Church, Selma
Robinson Memorial Presbyterian Church, Alexander City
Rock Springs Presbyterian Church, Magnolia (Marengo County)
Saint James Presbyterian Church, Moundville
Second Presbyterian Church, Birmingham
Shades Valley Presbyterian Church, Mountain Brook
South Highland Presbyterian Church, Birmingham
Southminster Presbyterian Church, Vestavia Hills
Springville Presbyterian Church
Trinity Presbyterian Church, Birmingham
Union Springs Presbyterian Church, Union Springs
University Presbyterian Church, Tuscaloosa
Valley Creek Presbyterian Church, Selma
Westminster Presbyterian Church, Birmingham
Westminster Presbyterian Church, Montgomery
Westminster Presbyterian Church, Tuskegee
Williams Memorial Presbyterian Church, Troy
Woods Presbyterian Church, Dadeville
Wylam Presbyterian Church

Former churches 
Avondale Presbyterian Church, Birmingham (1889–2009)
East Lake Presbyterian Church, East Lake (merged into Grace Presbyterian Church in 1999)
Eastminster Presbyterian Church, Trussville (merged into Cahaba Springs Presbyterian Church in 2013)
Grace Presbyterian Church, Trussville (merged into Cahaba Springs Presbyterian Church in 2013)
Huffman Presbyterian Church, Huffman (merged into Grace Presbyterian Church in 1999)
Mount Pinson Presbyterian Church (merged into Grace Presbyterian Church in 1999)
Unity Presbyterian Church, Weogufka (become affiliated with the Presbyterian Church in America in 2014)
Southwood Presbyterian Church, Talladega (become affiliated with the Presbyterian Church in America in 2014; now defunct)

References

External links 
Presbytery of Sheppards and Lapsley 

Presbyterian Church (USA)
Presbyterian Church (USA) presbyteries